Fencing competitions at the 2015 Pan American Games in Toronto were held from July 20 to 25 at the Toronto Pan Am Sports Centre (CIBC Pan Am/Parapan Am Aquatics Centre and Field House). Due to naming rights, the arena was known as the latter for the duration of the games. A total of twelve fencing events were held: six each for men and women.

Competition schedule

The following is the competition schedule for the fencing competitions:

Medal table

Medalists

Men's events

Women's events

Participating nations
A total of 17 countries have qualified athletes. The number of athletes a nation entered is in parentheses beside the name of the country.

Qualification

A total of 156  fencers qualified to compete at the games. Each nation could enter a team of up to eighteen fencers (a team consisting of three athletes in each event). A maximum of two fencers per country could be entered in the individual events, and one team in the team events. All qualification was done at the 2015 Pan American Championships, where the top 7 teams plus two individuals in each event will qualify. Hosts Canada are automatically qualified with a full team of 18 athletes.

See also
Fencing at the 2016 Summer Olympics

References

External link
Official Results Book

 
Events at the 2015 Pan American Games
Pan American Games
2015
International fencing competitions hosted by Canada